Southchase is a census-designated place and an unincorporated area in Orange County, Florida, United States. The population was 15,921 at the 2010 census. It is part of the Orlando–Kissimmee–Sanford, Florida Metropolitan Statistical Area.

Geography
Southchase is located at  (28.390652, -81.380222).

Demographics

At the 2000 census there were 4,633 people, 1,377 households, and 1,218 families living in the CDP.  The population density was 824.3/km (2,133.9/mi²).  There were 1,434 housing units at an average density of 255.1/km (660.5/mi²).  The racial makeup of the CDP was 59.27% White, 14.53% African American, 0.26% Native American, 9.15% Asian, 0.06% Pacific Islander, 11.55% from other races, and 5.18% from two or more races. Hispanic or Latino of any race were 33.82%.

Of the 1,377 households 52.1% had children under the age of 18 living with them, 75.0% were married couples living together, 9.9% had a female householder with no husband present, and 11.5% were non-families. 7.0% of households were one person and 1.4% were one person aged 65 or older.  The average household size was 3.36 and the average family size was 3.52.

The age distribution was 31.8% under the age of 18, 7.2% from 18 to 24, 37.0% from 25 to 44, 19.1% from 45 to 64, and 4.9% 65 or older.  The median age was 32 years. For every 100 females, there were 94.5 males.  For every 100 females age 18 and over, there were 92.4 males.

The median household income was $61,707 and the median family income  was $60,992. Males had a median income of $34,900 versus $28,670 for females. The per capita income for the CDP was $20,028.  About 3.3% of families and 3.0% of the population were below the poverty line, including 3.1% of those under age 18 and none of those age 65 or over.

References

Census-designated places in Orange County, Florida
Greater Orlando
Census-designated places in Florida
Planned communities in Florida